The Institution of Engineers of Ireland or the IEI, is the second oldest Engineering Society on the islands of Great Britain and Ireland, and was established in 1835.  The institution primarily represents members based in Ireland.

Membership of the institution is open to individuals based on academic and professional background and is separated into grades in accordance with criteria, including the Chartered Engineer and European Engineer titles.

The institution received its current legal name in 1969 by an Act of the Oireachtas. In October 2005 the institution adopted the operating name Engineers Ireland in an attempt to reduce any confusion over what the abbreviation IEI means, and as a substitute for its current legal name which is often considered unwieldy; the legal name is, however, unchanged.

History 

The history of the institution can be traced to 6 August 1835 when civil engineers met in Dublin; the result was the Civil Engineers Society of Ireland, in 1844 the society adopted the name the Institution of Civil Engineers of Ireland (ICEI). The institution received a Royal Charter on 15 October 1877, this being a significant milestone in obtaining international recognition and standing. In the early years of the Irish Free State Cumann na nInnealtóirí (The Engineers Association) was set up independently, in 1928, by incorporation under the Companies Act, 1908 to "improve and advance the status and remuneration of qualified members of the engineering profession" as it was felt that the ICEI's charter prevented its negotiation of employment conditions and salary.

In 1927 the ICEI elected their first woman member when Iris Cummins was admitted to the organisation.

As time progressed it was realised that the institution and association might better advance engineering in Ireland by amalgamation of both into a single organisation which would represent a broader set of engineering disciplines, so discussions commenced in 1965, and resulted in The Institution of Civil Engineers of Ireland (Charter Amendment) Act, 1969 leading to the redesignation of the unified institution as The Institution of Engineers of Ireland – Cumann na nInnealtóirí. Since this Act the institution has represented all branches of engineering in Ireland.

In 1997 the institution set up the Irish Academy of Engineering – official website, based at Bolton Street, Dublin Institute of Technology (Now Technological University Dublin).

Mission 

"The institution promotes the art and science of engineering...", in particular:

"Our members serve society through the highest standards of professional engineering. We seek to improve the quality of life for all, creating prosperity and adding value through innovation and the promotion of health, and sustainable development."

Responsibilities 

 Promote knowledge of engineering.
 Establish and maintain standards of professional engineering and engineering education.
 Provide opportunities for Continuing Professional Development (CPD) for engineers.
 Maintain standards of professional ethics and conduct.
 Ensure that professional titles are granted to qualified candidates.
 Act as the authoritative voice of the engineering profession in Ireland.

Professional Titles 

 Honorary Fellow of Engineers Ireland - FIEI (Hons)
 Fellow of Engineers Ireland - CEng FIEI
 Chartered Engineer - CEng MIEI
 Associate Engineer - AEng MIEI
 Engineering Technician - Eng Tech MIEI
 Member of Engineers Ireland - MIEI
 Technician Member of Engineers Ireland - Tech IEI

Sectors 

The institution is divided into three sectors; Divisions, Regions, and Societies, which are further subdivided – their purpose is to promote engineering and share knowledge.

Regions: An Ríocht; Cork; Donegal; GB; Middle East; Midlands; North-East; Northern; North-West; South-East; Thomond; West.
Divisions: Agriculture and Food; Biomedical; Chemical and Process; Civil; Electronic and Computing; Electrical; Energy and Environment; Fire and Safety; Local Government; Mechanical and Manufacturing; Structures and Construction.
Societies: Academic Society; An Roth; Geotechnical Society; Heritage Society; MEETA Society for Asset Managers; Project Management Society; Roads and Transportation Society; Water and Environmental Engineering Society; Young Engineers Society (Y.E.S).

International 

In accordance with EU requirements it is the designated authority for the engineering profession in Ireland. The institution is a national member of European Federation of National Engineering Associations (FEANI). The institution is also a signator to a number of multilateral agreements, these are principally for registered professional titles and accredited engineering programmes, for academic programmes these are:

The institution is also the signator to a number of bilateral agreements with engineering societies in the United Kingdom. These are for the dual recognition of corresponding Chartered Engineer, Associate Engineer and Engineering Technician grades of the institution.

What the Institution offers 

 Continuing Professional Development (CPD) training.
 Programme accreditation.
 CPD best practice for engineering employers.
 A national and regional programme of CPD-approved evening lectures and seminars.
 Meeting room and conference facility hire.
 Library and reading room with access to all our engineering literature.
 Publications such as the Engineers Journal (published by IFP Media), e-zines, academic reviews, technical papers and government submissions.
 Career advice and employment services to our members and partners.

Footnotes

See also 
 Education in the Republic of Ireland
 List of Irish learned societies
 List of universities in the Republic of Ireland

External links
 Official site
 RIAI CPD
 FEANI European Engineer Title

Engineering societies
Learned societies of Ireland
1835 establishments in Ireland
Professional associations based in Ireland
Seanad nominating bodies